Lorenzo Minotti (born 8 February 1967) is an Italian former professional footballer who played as a defender. Throughout his club career, he played for Italian sides Cesena, Parma, Cagliari, Torino, and Treviso; he is mostly remembered for his successful stint with Parma, where he won several domestic and international titles as the club's captain. At international level, he represented Italy on eight occasions between 1994 and 1995, and was a non-playing member of the team that reached the 1994 FIFA World Cup Final.

Personal life
Born in Cesena, Emilia-Romagna, in 1967, Minotti later grew up in San Giorgio, where he began to play football as a youth in the town's polisportiva, also competing in judo and athletics. He later joined the Cesena Youth squad at the age of 8, later making his professional debut with the senior side. Minotti and his wife Debora have two children: Alex, who plays football for the Bologna youth side, and Andrea.

Club career
Minotti started his professional career his in 1985 with his hometown club Cesena in Serie B, at the age of 18, and he subsequently played in Serie A with Parma (1987–1996) for most of his career, followed by spells with Cagliari (1996–97), Torino (1997–2000), and Treviso (2000–2001). In total, he played 201 matches and scored 19 goals in Serie A, and during his successful time with Parma under manager Nevio Scala, he won two Coppa Italia titles, one UEFA Cup, an UEFA Super Cup, and one UEFA Cup Winners' Cup in 1993, also receiving Runners-up medals in the 1995 Supercoppa Italiana, and the 1996–97 Serie A. The victorious 1993 European Cup Winners' Cup Final game over Royal Antwerp F.C. was played at the Wembley Stadium, and Minotti opened the scoring with a notable volley as the Italians went on to win 3–1. Minotti is regarded as one of the best players in Parma's history, and he served as the club's captain for many years.

International career
Minotti won 8 caps for the Italy national football team between 1994 and 1995. He received his first international call-up for Italy's match against Switzerland on 14 October 1992, although he only made his first appearance for Italy on 16 February 1994, in a 1–0 home defeat to France. He was also chosen by manager Arrigo Sacchi for Italy's roster at the 1994 FIFA World Cup, without playing any games in the final tournament, as Italy reached the 1994 FIFA World Cup final.

Style of play
A fast, powerful, modern, and tactically versatile left-footed defender, Minotti was capable of playing anywhere along the defensive line, both as a centre-back, or on occasion as a full-back, although his main role was that of a sweeper. A correct, consistent, hard-working, and intelligent player, he was known for his marking and the timing of his challenges, as well as his leadership, and his ability to read the game, which made him an important member of Parma's starting line-up in the 90s, leading him to become the club's captain and to be called up for the Italian national side. Minotti was also known for his excellent ability in the air and for his adeptness at making attacking runs, which allowed him to contribute to his team's offensive play with several goals throughout his career, despite being a defender; a powerful and accurate striker of the ball, he was also capable of scoring from volleys and curling free-kicks.

Post-playing career
After retiring from football, he became team manager of his former club Parma from 2002 to 2004. He then became director of football of Cesena from 2007 to 2009, and again from June 2010 to May 2012. In 2015, he worked as a football commentator for Sky Italia. Later that year, he was named the head of the technical sector of Parma, following the club's relegation to Serie D due to bankruptcy.

Honours

Club
Parma
Coppa Italia: 1991–92
UEFA Cup Winners' Cup: 1992–93
UEFA Super Cup: 1993
UEFA Cup: 1994–95

International
Italy
FIFA World Cup: Runner-up 1994

References

1967 births
Living people
People from Cesena
Italian footballers
Italy international footballers
Association football defenders
A.C. Cesena players
Parma Calcio 1913 players
Cagliari Calcio players
Torino F.C. players
Treviso F.B.C. 1993 players
Serie A players
Serie B players
1994 FIFA World Cup players
UEFA Cup winning players
Footballers from Emilia-Romagna
Sportspeople from the Province of Forlì-Cesena